Noah Kahan (born January 1, 1997) is an American singer-songwriter of folk-infused pop who signed to Republic Records in 2017. Kahan released his first single, "Young Blood" on January 27, 2017, and released four other singles over the course of 2017. His fans are known as "busyheads". Kahan made his television debut in 2018 on The Late Show with Stephen Colbert performing the single "Hurt Somebody". Kahan released his debut Extended Play (EP) carrying the same name in January 2018, including an updated version of titular song with fellow Republic Records artist Julia Michaels.

Biography

Early life 
Kahan was born in Strafford, Vermont. He attended Hanover High School in Hanover, New Hampshire. Kahan began writing songs at age 8 and uploaded them to SoundCloud where his music began to gain exposure. Kahan says that the first job he ever had was working for a valet at a hotel, where he was later fired for crashing a car.  

At age 17, Kahan began working with school friend music producers (Cwenga Matanzima). This attracted the attention of his current manager Drew Simmons of Foundations Artist Management. His music also caught the attention of songwriters such as Dan Wilson known for his work with Adele, Scott Harris,  Carrie Underwood, among others. Kahan deferred his admission to Tulane University to pursue his developing music career. Kahan has said that two career goals he wished for were to be verified on Instagram and to have a Wikipedia page.

Kahan cites some of his inspirations as Paul Simon, Cat Stevens, Counting Crows, Hozier, and Mumford and Sons.

Kahan has opened up about his struggles with anxiety and depression and has talked extensively about how his struggles with these disorders have affected his life. He has spoken about how writing about these topics has proved to be therapeutic for him.  

“I’ve been struggling with anxiety and depression for as long as I can remember,” Kahan told an Australian news outlet. “I didn’t know what it was until I got into high school. Then, when I started releasing music and seeing it connect with others, I realised it wasn’t something I had to be ashamed of and that people were actually connecting to my music. So it’s a real thing and it’s a really hard thing I have to deal with all the time and it sucks, and it’s shitty. Sometimes it feels like everyone around me is doing well and I feel like I’m kind of missing something. But what’s great is music gives me an outlet to express it and it helps other people. So [anxiety] has its ups and downs.”

2017–present: music career 
In 2016, Kahan signed to Republic Records and he began working with producer Joel Little, known for his work with Lorde and Khalid, with whom he recorded six songs. Kahan released his first single "Young Blood" on January 27, 2017, and gained over 9 million streams.

On September 15, 2017, Kahan released "Hurt Somebody", the lead single from his forthcoming debut extended play of the same name. "Hurt Somebody" was re-recorded later in 2017 featuring Grammy nominated artist Julia Michaels. Hurt Somebody was released in January 2018.

On April 8, 2019, Kahan announced his debut full-length studio album entitled Busyhead, and included the duet version of "Hurt Somebody" as well as two other singles "False Confidence" and "Mess". It was released on June 14, 2019.

On April 30, 2020, Noah announced on his Instagram that he would drop an EP at midnight. He then dropped "Cape Elizabeth." The album was recorded over one week at Kahan's friend Phin Choukas' home studio in Vermont exactly one week after the singer left New York City in March to avoid COVID-19. Cape Elizabeth was then released on May 1, 2020.

On June 17, 2021, Kahan announced his second full-length album titled I Was/I Am. Five days later he announced the I Was/I Am tour. On September 17, 2021, the album was released. Throughout the summer leading up to the release of the album Kahan released “Part of Me”, “Godlight”, and “Animal” as singles ahead of the album drop. “Part of Me” was the only one of the three singles to be dropped before the album announcement.

On July 8, 2022, Kahan announced a U.S. tour for the fall and released the single "Stick Season," which he had first teased in October 2020. Over the following two years, the song became a fan favorite, further growing in popularity on social media app TikTok. Kahan followed it up with the release of "Northern Attitude" on September 16.

On October 14, 2022, Kahan released his album Stick Season. According to early reviews of the album from AP News, "There’s irony there because these feel like songs both longtime listeners and newer fans will want to belt back to Kahan — not because they’re produced for stadiums or arenas, but because they’re full of nostalgic melodies that will resonate far beyond New England." Kahan wrote this album during the pandemic which he spent back home in Vermont. Stick Season leans more into the folk genre than the rest of his older music which were more pop sounding. Kahan says that in this new album Stick Season he wanted to pay homage to the folk singers that he grew up listening to. He adds that his greatest goal as a songwriter is to write music that other people can relate to and to be able to throw that lifeline to someone.

Tours 
Kahan opened for Ben Folds and Anderson East in the United States in February 2017 and then went on to open for Milky Chance in March 2017. Later opening on an East Coast tour with The Strumbellas that began on October 12, 2017, in Milwaukee, Wisconsin, and concluded on November 14, 2017, in Buffalo, New York. He performed at Billboard's Industry Night on November 16, 2017, at the Ludlow House in New York City, showcasing his pop-folk song "Fine". In April and May 2018, Kahan supported George Ezra on his North American tour and then directly after embarked on his own tour, headlining shows across Europe throughout May 2018. Kahan then embarked on a world tour in October and November 2018, with Dean Lewis joining him in support for the North American leg. He later opened for Dean Lewis on his tour of Europe in February 2019, then joining James Bay on his North American tour for the following month. Kahan toured for 'The Busyhead Tour', in which he headlined shows across North America from September to November 2019.

In October 2021, Kahan headlined his 'I Am / I Was Tour', with support from Blake Rose and Genevieve Stokes.

In October 2022, Kahan headlined his 'Stick Season Tour', with support from Adam Melchor.

Kahan will support Dermot Kennedy on his UK tour in March and April 2023.

Discography

Studio albums

Extended plays

Singles

Notes

Other charted songs

References

External links

 www.noahkahan.com/#//

1997 births 
21st-century American singers
21st-century American male singers
American male singer-songwriters
American singer-songwriters
Jewish singers 
Living people
Musicians from Vermont
People from Hanover, New Hampshire
People from Strafford, Vermont
Singers from New Hampshire
Singers from Vermont